Oradour is the name or part of the name of several communes in France:

 Oradour-sur-Glane,  in the Haute-Vienne département, destroyed along with almost all of its inhabitants by the Nazis
Oradour-sur-Glane massacre
 Oradour, Cantal
 Oradour, Charente
 Oradour-Fanais, in the Charente département
 Oradour-Saint-Genest, in the Haute-Vienne département
 Oradour-sur-Vayres, in the Haute-Vienne département